Tailgates & Tanlines is the third studio album by American country music artist Luke Bryan. It was released on August 9, 2011, by Capitol Records Nashville. Bryan co-wrote eight of the album's thirteen tracks, including its first single, "Country Girl (Shake It for Me)." American Songwriter called Tailgates & Tanlines "a soundtrack for fun and sun, along with an instantaneous cure for the summertime blues." The song "Too Damn Young" was originally recorded by Julie Roberts on her 2006 album Men & Mascara.

Commercial performance
Tailgates & Tanlines debuted at number two on the US Billboard 200 chart and number one on the Top Country Albums chart, selling 145,295 copies in its first week. It was Luke Bryan best-selling album until it was surpassed by Crash My Party in April 2015. As of April 2017, the album has sold 2,570,700 copies in the US. On September 5, 2017, the album was certified quadruple platinum by the Recording Industry Association of America (RIAA) for selling over four million copies in the United States.

In Canada, the album debuted at number six on the Canadian Albums Chart. The album was certified by Music Canada for sales of over 80,000 copies in Canada.

Track listing

Personnel

Mark Bright – keyboards
Mike Brignardello – bass guitar
Luke Bryan – lead vocals
J.T. Corenflos – electric guitar
Eric Darken – percussion
Clare Dunn – background vocals
Paul Franklin – pedal steel guitar
Kenny Greenberg – electric guitar
Steve Hinson – pedal steel guitar
Rob Ickes – dobro
Jeff King – electric guitar
Brent Mason – electric guitar
Georgia Middleman – background vocals

Greg Morrow – drums
Mike Rojas – organ, piano
Ashton Shepherd – background vocals on "Tailgate Blues"
Adam Shoenfeld – electric guitar
Jimmie Lee Sloas – bass guitar
Joe Spivey – fiddle, mandolin
Russell Terrell – background vocals
Rachel Thibodeau – background vocals
Ilya Toshinsky – banjo, acoustic guitar, mandolin
John Willis – acoustic guitar

Charts

Weekly charts

Year-end charts

Decade-end charts

Singles

Certifications

References

2011 albums 
Albums produced by Mark Bright (record producer)
Capitol Records Nashville albums
Luke Bryan albums